The Broad Centre Right Front (Grand Front Centre Droit))  is a political party in Haiti. The party won in the 7 February 2006 Senate elections 2.1% of the popular vote and no Senators. In the 7 February and 21 April 2006 Chamber of Deputies elections, the party won no seats.

Political parties in Haiti